Mass No. 1 in F major,  105, is a mass composed by Franz Schubert in 1814. It was the first of Schubert's masses to be performed, and is of the  type.

Background

The mass was composed for the centennial celebration of the parish church of Lichtental, now part of Vienna. Schubert received an invitation to compose a mass for the anniversary in May 1814. The premiere was conducted on 25 September with an estimated 62 performers, a large contingent for contemporary performances. The composer's brother Ferdinand played the organ, Michael Holzer served as choirmaster, Joseph Mayseder served as concertmaster, Therese Grob sang the soprano solo, and Schubert conducted. Schubert's teacher Antonio Salieri may have attended the premiere; afterwards, he is said to have embraced his student with the words "" ("You will bring me yet more honour").

Ferdinand wrote that a second performance took place ten days later at St Augustine's Court Church, before a prestigious audience that may have included foreign dignitaries.

Schubert's love for Therese Grob may have been kindled during the writing of this mass. The prominent first soprano solo, with its high tessitura, was designed to showcase her voice.

Schubert composed an alternative  (formerly  185) in April 1815. This may have been composed for a service during the public outcry over Napoleon's escape from Elba; alternatively, it may have been for a second performance of the mass at the Lichtental church on Trinity Sunday. It replaces a shorter, less fugal section in the 1814 version.

Structure

The piece is divided into six movements. Performances require approximately 40 minutes. Notes are based on Schubert's 1815 revision.

"" , F major, 6/8
"" , C major, cut common time
"..." , F major, 3/4; STB soloists
"..." choir
"..." , D minor, common time; SATB soloists and choir
"..." , C major, common time
"..." , C major, cut common time
"" , F major, 3/4
"" , F major, common time
"" , B-flat major, 3/4; soprano and tenor quartette
"" , F minor, common time
"..." , F major, 6/8

References

External links

Masses by Franz Schubert
1814 compositions
1814 in the Austrian Empire
Compositions in F major